Senlis is a commune in the Oise département of France.

Senlis may also refer to:

Places
 Senlis, Pas-de-Calais, France
 Senlis-le-Sec, France

People
 Simon I de Senlis, Earl of Huntingdon-Northampton (died  1111), Norman nobleman
 Simon II de Senlis, Earl of Huntingdon-Northampton ( 1098–1153), Norman nobleman
 Michelle Senlis (1933–2020), French lyricist

See also

The International Council on Security and Development, formerly known as the Senlis Council, an international think tank 
Treaty of Senlis, 1493